Terrace Park is a neighborhood within the city limits of Tampa, Florida, United States. As of the 2000 census the neighborhood had a population of 7,579. The ZIP Codes serving the neighborhood are 33612 and 33617.

Geography
Terrace Park boundaries are the University of South Florida to the north, 30th Street to the west, Busch Blvd. to the south, and Temple Terrace to the east.

Demographics
Source: Hillsborough County Atlas

At the 2010 census there were 7,579 people and 3,143 households residing in the neighborhood. The population density was  4,111/mi2. The racial makeup of the city was 51% White, 35% African American, 1% Native American, 4% Asian, less than 5% from other races, and 4% from two or more races. Hispanic or Latino of any race were 22%.

Of the 3,143 households 30% had children under the age of 18 living with them, 35% were married couples living together, 19% had a female householder with no husband present, and 10% were non-families. 32% of households were made up of individuals.

The age distribution was 27% under the age of 18, 30% from 18 to 34, 22% from 35 to 49, 12% from 50 to 64, and 9% 65 or older. For every 100 females, there were 87.0 males.

The per capita income for the neighborhood was $15,227. About 20% of the population were below the poverty line, including 30.0% of those under age 18 and 12.0% of those age 65 or over.

Attractions
Terrace Park is home to the Museum Of Science and Industry, which is located on the northern part of the neighborhood, Busch Gardens, and Adventure Island. Just to the northwest of the district is University Mall.

See also
Neighborhoods in Tampa, Florida

References

External links

Terrace Park Neighborhood Association 

Neighborhoods in Tampa, Florida